Ledaea is a genus of moths in the family Erebidae. The genus was erected by Herbert Druce in 1891.

The Global Lepidoptera Names Index gives this name as a synonym of Spargaloma Grote, 1873.

Species
Ledaea arciva H. Druce, 1891 Panama
Ledaea marcella H. Druce, 1891 Costa Rica
Ledaea perditalis (Walker, [1859]) North America

References

Pangraptinae
Moth genera